Michelle Ann Duff (born Michael Alan Duff on December 13, 1939) is a former Grand Prix motorcycle road racer.

Riding 
Duff's best season was in 1965, winning the 250cc Finnish Grand Prix and finishing the year in second place to Phil Read.

Duff suffered a near-fatal crash in Japan and required extensive surgery and physical therapy. The recovery was documented in the 1967 National Film Board of Canada short documentary film Ride for Your Life, directed by Robin Spry.

Private life 
Duff married a Finnish woman in 1963 and had a son with her the same year, and a daughter two years later. In 1984, she changed her name to Michelle and commenced transition, separating from her wife. Following sex reassignment surgery, she wrote about her life as a trans woman in Make Haste, Slowly: The Mike Duff story.

World Championship results 

(key) (Races in bold indicate pole position; races in italics indicate fastest lap. An empty black cell indicates that the class did not compete at that particular championship round.)

References

1939 births
Living people
125cc World Championship riders
250cc World Championship riders
350cc World Championship riders
500cc World Championship riders
Canadian motorcycle racers
Isle of Man TT riders
Canadian LGBT sportspeople
LGBT racing drivers
Sportspeople from Toronto
Transgender sportspeople
Transgender women